Nittur is a village in Tumkur district of Karnataka, India.

Nittur is famous for Jwalamalini Temple, an ancient Jain centre. The Jwalamalini Temple (also known as Shantinatha Digambar Jain temple) is said to have been built in the year 1175 A.D. It was famous as “the Ayyahole of the South”. Originally, the idol of Bhagawan Adinatha was the main deity in this temple, but with the passage of time it was ruined; the present idol of Bhagawan Shanthinatha was installed on 26 January 1969.

See also
Hagalavadi

References

Villages in Tumkur district